Omar Hani Ismail Al Zebdieh (born 27 June 1999) is a Jordanian professional footballer who plays as a winger for Azerbaijan Premier League club Gabala, and the Jordan national team.

Career

Club
On 1 September 2021, Gabala announced the signing of Hani to a one-year contract, with the option of an additional year, from APOEL. On 22 June 2022, Gabala announced that they had extended Hani's contract for an additional year.

Career statistics

Club

References

External links
 

1999 births
Living people
Jordanian footballers
Association football midfielders
Al-Faisaly SC players
APOEL FC players
Olympiakos Nicosia players
Jordanian Pro League players
Cypriot First Division players
Jordan youth international footballers
Jordan international footballers
Jordanian expatriate footballers
Expatriate footballers in Cyprus
Jordanian expatriate sportspeople in Cyprus
Gabala FC players
Azerbaijan Premier League players
Expatriate footballers in Azerbaijan
Jordanian expatriate sportspeople in Azerbaijan